Employment is the debut studio album by English indie rock band Kaiser Chiefs, released in March 2005 on B-Unique Records. Employment takes its inspirations from the Britpop and new wave movements, 1970s-era punk rock and Beach Boys-esque West Coast music.

The album originally charted at number three in the UK Albums Chart on 13 March 2005, but charted at number two almost a year after its release, due to the band's success at the Brit Awards. Employment went on to become the fourth best-selling album in the United Kingdom that year.

Background
It was Kaiser Chiefs themselves that chose to work with producer Stephen Street. According to Street he had been introduced to Nick Hodgson after an Ordinary Boys gig in which Kaiser Chiefs were the support act. Hodgson gave Street a demo CD and said that they would love to work with him. The band's new label B-Unique suggested they try a test session with Street. In mid-August 2004 they visited the producer at a basement studio space at Olympic Studios he was renting with engineer Cenzo Townsend and recorded "I Predict a Riot".

According to manager James Sandom in an interview with HitQuarters, the album was recorded in a rush because the band were under very tight time constraints and touring at the time. As a result, they did not have enough time to get to know Stephen Street and relax in his company. The motorbike that appears at the beginning of "Saturday Night" is owned and 'played' by Graham Coxon. The sleeve notes read "Graham Coxon's motorbike, (1935 Kaiser 'Chief' 750cc Manx TT Works Racer) appears courtesy of Transcopic Records". "Caroline, Yes" is named in reference to The Beach Boys' song "Caroline, No". The track's original working title was called "Hail to the Chief", according to Kaiser Chiefs' book A Record of Employment.

A DVD titled Enjoyment, featuring music videos and live performances of the album's songs, was also released.

Reception

Rolling Stone (p. 76) - 4 stars out of 5 - "Danceable art-punk gems full of guitar fuzz, na-na-na choruses and boyish energy..."
Spin (p. 62) - Ranked #19 in Spin's "40 Best Albums of 2005" - "A cohesive debut that recalls the glory days of Britpop and second-wave punk." 
Spin (p. 102) - "The quintet bash through nervy, synth-stoked guitar pop....With a dedication to daffy English humor and bouncy music-hall folderol that creates the illusion of cultural import." - Grade: B+
Entertainment Weekly (No. 814, p. 64) - "The Leeds five have polished their ability to craft catchy songs." - Grade: B
Uncut (p. 105) - 4 stars out of 5 - "Employment is a gem...In the smart-pop steeplechase, Hot Hot Heat have got serious competition."
Yahoo Music - "finally, a worthy successor to Blur." - 8/10
Mojo (p. 64) - Ranked #50 in Mojo's "The 50 Best Albums of 2005" - "Ricky Wilson's cheeky chappies proved the power of knowing daftness."
Mojo (p. 109) - 4 stars out of 5 - "Employing ill-fitting suits, tongue-in-cheek lyricism and a jerky guitar attack that smelts the classic rock canon into an infectious, head-spinning punch."
AllMusic - 4 stars out of 5 - "Employment is an uneven but still very promising debut that suggests that one day the Kaiser Chiefs will pull off something even more ambitious."

Track listing

Charts and certifications

Weekly charts

Year-end charts

Certifications

References

2005 debut albums
Kaiser Chiefs albums
Albums produced by Stephen Street
B-Unique Records albums